Season 1882–83 was the eighth season in which Heart of Midlothian competed at a Scottish national level, entering the Scottish Cup for the eighth time.

Overview 
Hearts reached the third round of the Scottish Cup and were knocked out by Vale of Leven. They also reached the semi final of the Edinburgh Fa Cup.

Results

Scottish Cup

Edinburgh FA Cup

Rosebery Charity Cup

See also
List of Heart of Midlothian F.C. seasons

References 

 Statistical Record 82-83

External links 
 Official Club website

Heart of Midlothian F.C. seasons
Hearts